Abbott Island is an island lying  west of Davis Island in the south part of Bouquet Bay, off the northeast side of Brabant Island in the Palmer Archipelago. Roughly charted by the French Antarctic Expedition under Jean-Baptiste Charcot, 1903–05. Photographed by Hunting Aerosurveys Ltd in 1956–57, and mapped from these photos in 1959. Named by the United Kingdom Antarctic Place-Names Committee (UK-APC) after Maude Abbott, a Canadian authority on congenital heart disease.

See also 
 Composite Antarctic Gazetteer
 List of Antarctic and sub-Antarctic islands
 Scientific Committee on Antarctic Research
 Territorial claims in Antarctica

References

External links 

Islands of the Palmer Archipelago